Senator Hansen may refer to:

Bill Hansen (politician) (born 1931), Iowa State Senate
Clifford Hansen (1912–2009), Wisconsin State Senate
Dave Hansen (born 1947), Michigan State Senate
Goeff Hansen (born 1959), Nevada State Senate
Ira Hansen (born 1960), Montana State Senate
Ken Hansen (born 1951), Nebraska State Senate
Matt Hansen (born 1988), Idaho State Senate
Orval H. Hansen (1926–2017), Idaho State Senate
Stephanie Hansen (born 1961), Delaware State Senate
Tom Hansen (Nebraska politician) (born 1946), Nebraska State Senate
Tom Hansen (South Dakota politician) (born 1939), South Dakota State Senate
William C. Hansen (1891–1983), Wisconsin State Senate

See also
Senator Hanson (disambiguation)